World of Dance is a Southern California-based dance, fashion, music, and entertainment brand founded by David Gonzalez, Myron Marten, and Michael McGinn in 2008. It is the world's largest dance entertainment enterprise, elevating artists and brands with events, entertainment and digital engagement. The brand encompasses more platforms than any other dance content provider or dance show case, including World of Dance competitions in more than 25 countries, the NBC World of Dance television show (executive produced by Jennifer Lopez), the World of Dance Live tour, a fashion line, and the largest YouTube dance network with more than 300 channels, including the World of Dance YouTube channel, with more than 4 million subscribers. Its events bring together performers from the street, urban, and hip hop dance world, connecting the dance community with a particular focus on millennial and post-millennial audiences.

In 2017, World of Dance launched World of Dance Digital Lab, a full-service, in-house production studio connecting brands to youth culture. Services include branded entertainment, influencer marketing, content strategy and production, targeted media distribution, and experiential activations.

World of Dance Competitions 
The first World of Dance competition was held in 2008. Since then, the brand has expanded to competitions in more than 25 countries. Each year, World of Dance Qualifier events are held around the world (40 internationally, 15 in the U.S.), bringing together street and urban dance crews to compete for two titles: winner of the Upper Division (for 18 years and older) and winner of the Youth Division (17 years old or younger). The winners of each category are invited to compete at World of Dance Finals event, where they compete for the world title.

World of Dance competitions are notable for their scoring approach. Each competition is judged by a five-person panel, usually composed of dance celebrities, industry professionals, and influencers. Using an Olympic-style approach, competitors are judged according to five criteria: Performance, Technique, Choreography, Creativity, and Presentation. Each category is worth 20 points, for a total of 100 points. Once all judges have inputted their score, the highest and lowest scores are removed, and the final score is the average score of the remaining three. Those with a score above 85 move on to finals.

In addition to the competition, World of Dance events also include performances from industry talent (non-competing), dance crews, choreographers, and freestylers, as well as live battles, appearances by industry influences, music, live art, vendors, and more.

Notable World of Dance judges, performers, guests 
World of Dance events feature the industry's best as judges, performers, or guests, including many performers who have appeared in nationally televised dance competitions, such as World of Dance, So You Think You Can Dance, America's Best Dance Crew (ABDC), and more. Notable WOD guests include all seven ABDC champions, JabbaWockeeZ, Super Cr3w, Quest Crew, We Are Heroes, Poreotics, I.aM.mE, and Electrolytes. Additional performers include 8 Flavahz, Kaba Modern, SoReal Cru, Gotham actress Camren Bicondova, Les Twins, Chachi Gonzales, Dytto, Ian Eastwood, Kaelynn Gobert-Harris, Black-ish star Miles Brown, SYTYCD Season 10 Male Winner Fik-Shun, and India's famous dance group/WOD winners Desi Hoppers, led by Shantanu Maheshwari and Kings United led by Suresh.

World of Dance Television Show 

In 2017, the NBC premiered World of Dance, a 10-episode dance competition program produced by Universal Television Alternative Studio in association with Nuyorican Productions and World of Dance. Executive producing are Jennifer Lopez, Elaine Goldsmith-Thomas, Benny Medina, Kris Curry, Matilda Zoltowski, David Gonzalez and Matthew Everitt. The show features celebrity judges Jennifer Lopez, Derek Hough, Ne-Yo, and host/mentor Jenna Dewan-Tatum, along with 50 of the world's best dancers and dance teams competing for a $1 million prize—the largest prize of any dance competition show.

As Lopez told the New York Times, “My whole goal with this show was to create an opportunity and a venue for dancers to actually be the stars,” Ms. Lopez said, and to get to do something they rarely have a chance to do: “really make some money.”

World of Dance contestants were picked from qualifying events around the nation and online submissions. Contestants are divided into three divisions:
 Junior: Any size act, 17 years old and under
 Upper: Groups of 1–4, 18 and older
 Team: Groups of 5+, 18 and older
In each episode, dancers compete before the judges and are scored according to World of Dance scoring criteria: Performance, Technique, Choreography, Creativity, and Presentation. Each category is worth 20 points, for a total of 100 points. The show consists of five rounds:
 The Qualifiers: In each round of the Qualifiers, the dance acts perform a 2-minute routine in front of the judges and a live audience. They are judged according to criteria, and only those who receive a combined total score of 80 or higher move forward.
 The Duels: Acts are paired against each other, and the highest scoring act moves on to the next round. In each round of The Duels, two acts in the same division compete for a spot in the next round. In each division, the acts with the top qualifying scores choose their opponents, then both acts perform back-to-back, receiving feedback from the judges. After each performance, the judges score them. Unlike the Qualifiers, only the final combined total score for each act is shown. The act with the highest score at the end of the duel moves on to the next round; the other faces immediate elimination.
 The Cut: In The Cut, the 15 remaining acts compete for three spots in each of their divisions.
 Divisional Finals: Two acts in each division compete against each other, winners in each division move on to the next round.
 World Finals: In the World Final, the final 3 acts, one from each division, compete to win the one million dollar prize.
The show premiered May 30, 2016 at 10/9 central on NBC, debuting to 9.8 million viewers. It was renewed for a second season in June 2017.

Season 1 Performers 
Junior Division: 801 Squad, Alaman, Boys of Temecula, D'Angelo and Amanda, Diana Pombo, Eva Igo, ImmaBEAST, JJ & Joey, Kaeli and Brandon, KynTay, Mini ReQuest, The Lab, The Maya Boys, The Mihacevich Sisters, The POSSE.

Upper Division: Al Taw'am, DNA, Femme Fatale, Fik-Shun, Keone & Mari, Desi Hoppers, Kyle Van Newkirk, Les Twins, Luka & Jenalyn, Nick Daniels, Pasión, Quick Style, Slavek and Juliet, The Nitty Grittyz Trent Jeray, Vibration.

Team: Chapkis Dance Family, FUZE, Ian Eastwood and the Young Lions, Jabbawockeez. Kinjaz, Miami All Stars, NXT LVL, P.L.A.Y., ProdiJIG, Rhythmatic, Rouge, Royal Flux, Stroll Groove, Super Cr3w, Swing Latino, The Kingdom.

Judges 
The judging lineup of Lopez, Hough, and Ne-Yo was announced in November 2016. The judges were selected both for their dance experience, as well as their passion for spotlighting dancers.

Meredith Ahr, President of Universal Television Alternative Studio, called them ““three of the most accomplished dancers of their generation.” Lopez told Entertainment Weekly, “We all love dance, we all are performers, and we all are competitive, which you have to be in this business. We come from different backgrounds, so we bring those sensibilities.”

Critical Reception 
Marketed as “the biggest dance competition in the world,” the show garnered national attention, particularly for its wide style of performances and popular performers. Les Twins (Beyoncé's former backup dancers) made headlines in USA Today, which wrote, "Although the audience was cheering along to Les Twins’ fierce moves the entire performance, their routine's intense ending made judge Jennifer Lopez jump out of her seat in shock."[20]

Similarly, young contemporary dancer Diana Pombo’s first performance made Lopez tear up, while others like Luka & Jenalyn, Fik-Shun, and Nick Daniels also wowed the crowd.

As USA Today wrote, “What the show also has going for it is the sense of inclusion that you don’t always find on reality TV. The show celebrates the people and cultures represented on its stage, from an Asian-American dance team that takes its inspiration from martial arts to a young Colombian-American girl from Miami who pauses to tell “Miss JLo” that she's her idol. She cried, Lopez cried, and you'll probably cry, too.”

Events 

May 14, 2022, World of Dance New Jersey, iPLAY AMERICA 
August 16, 2015, World of Dance Finals, Los Angeles Convention Center
August 15, 2015, World of Dance Los Angeles, Los Angeles Convention Center
July 13, 2015, World of Dance Vancouver, Croatian Cultural Centre
May 30, 2015, World of Dance Orlando, Osceola Performing Arts Center and Expo
May 23, 2015, World of Dance New Jersey, iPLAY AMERICA
May 18, 2015, World of Dance Philippine Qualifier, UP Theater
April 12, 2015, World of Dance Belgium Qualifier, Venue to be determined
April 11, 2015, World of Dance Dallas, South Side Ballroom
April 5, 2015 World of Dance France Qualifier, La Salle Du Summum de Grenoble
March 21, 2015, World of Dance Anaheim, The Grove
February 10, 2015, World of Dance Industry Awards, Avalon Hollywood
January 25, 2015, World of Dance Montreal, Rialto Theatre Montreal
December 20, 2014, World of Dance Las Vegas, Cashman Center
December 14, 2014, World of Dance Hawaii, Blaisdell Concert Hall
November 22, 2014, World of Dance Chicago, Copernicus Theater
November 22, 2014: World of Dance Germany, Huxleys Neue Welt
November 15, 2014: World of Dance Seattle, Highline Performing Arts Center
November 2, 2014: World of Dance Boston, Back Bay Event Center
October 19, 2014: World of Dance Netherlands, Dommelstraat 2
October 18, 2014: World of Dance San Diego, California Center for the Arts
October 4, 2014: World of Dance Toronto, Queen Elizabeth Theatre
September 28, 2014: World of Dance London, Coronet London
August 30, 2014: World of Dance Live, Universal Citywalk
August 23, 2014: World of Dance Houston, Warehouse Live
August 16, 2014: World of Dance Bay Area, Solano Fairgrounds
April 26, 2014: World of Dance Dallas, South Side Ballroom
April 19, 2014: World of Dance Orlando, Osceola Performing Arts Center and Expo
April 12, 2014: World of Dance Los Angeles, Los Angeles Convention Center
March 23, 2014: World of Dance Belgium, TRIX
December 8, 2013: World of Dance Hawaii, Blaisdell Arena
November 16, 2013: World of Dance San Diego, San Diego Concourse
November 15, 2013: World of Dance Chicago, Copernicus Theater
November 9, 2013: World of Dance New Jersey, Encore Event Center
November 2, 2013: World of Dance Boston, Chevalier Theater 
October 12, 2013: World of Dance Toronto, Queen Elizabeth Theatre
September 29, 2013: World of Dance Netherlands, DommelStraat 2
September 7, 2013 World of Dance Seattle, Auburn Performing Arts
August 31, 2013: World of Dance Live, Universal Studios Citywalk
August 24, 2013: World of Dance Houston, Warehouse Live
August 17, 2013: World of Dance Bay Area, Solano County Fairgrounds
July 27, 2013: World of Dance Orlando, Osceola Performing Arts Center and Expo
June 22, 2013: World of Dance Vancouver, Croatian Cultural Centre
May 25, 2013: World of Dance New York, Terminal 5
April 20, 2013: World of Dance Dallas, Palladium Ballroom
April 6, 2013: World of Dance Los Angeles, Los Angeles Convention Center
December 8, 2012: World of Dance Hawaii, Blaisdell Arena Honolulu, Hawaii
November 17, 2012: World of Dance Chicago, Copernicus Theater
November 10, 2012: World of Dance Boston, Chevalier Theater
October 6, 2012: World of Dance San Diego, San Diego Concourse
September 29, 2012: World of Dance Vancouver, Douglas College
September 8, 2012: World of Dance Seattle, Auburn Performing Arts Center
August 18, 2012: World of Dance San Francisco, Solano County Fairgrounds
May 26, 2012: World of Dance New York, Harlem Armory
May 20, 2012: World of Dance Toronto, Sound Academy
April 21, 2012: World of Dance Dallas, Palladium Nightclub
April 7, 2012: World of Dance Los Angeles, Los Angeles Convention Center
March 10, 2012: Lifestyle Event “Beat Swap Meet” - one of the best urban events held downtown Los Angeles
March 3, 2012: Battlefest 17, Inside Pulse New York City
March 3, 2012: Urban Street Jam Event, Anaheim Convention Center - featured over 40 groups competing in Adult, Varsity and Junior Varsity sections
February 19, 2012: 2nd Annual World of Dance Industry Awards, ICON Ultra Lounge
November 27, 2011: World of Dance Chicago, Chicago Theater Illinois Chicago
November 5, 2011: World of Dance Boston, Chevalier Theater Boson, Massachusetts
October 15, 2011: World of Dance San Diego Concourse
September 18, 2011: World of Dance Toronto
August 20, 2011: World of Dance – Solano County Fairgrounds
April 2, 2011: World of Dance Los Angeles 2011, Los Angeles Convention Center - Hype took 1st place
2011: World of Dance Seattle, B-boys Battle

WOD 2012 Industry Awards
Decade of Dance Award – Napoleon and Tabitha D'umo (Nappytabs) were recognized for their achievement and dedication to the hip-hop dance community.
Best Junior Team Award – Chi-Town's Finest Breakers were honored as the Best Junior Team of the year.
Teen Choreographer of the year – 16-year-old Chachi Gonzales was named Teen Choreographer of the Year.
Team of the Year - Mos Wanted Crew was nominated for Team of the Year.
January 29, 2012: Vibe 17 Dance Competition, UCI Bren Events Center

See also 
 So You Think You Can Dance
 Dancing with the Stars
 Dance Dance Dance
 America's Best Dance Crew
 World of Dance (TV series)
 The X Factor

References

External links 
 

Street dance competitions